Sandile Sibande (born 27 September 1987) is a South African soccer player who played as a midfielder.

Sandile Sibande was born in Matsulu, A township in Nelspruit, Mpumalanga
Sibande was born in Nelspruit.

References

1987 births
Living people
People from Mbombela
South African soccer players
Association football midfielders
Bidvest Wits F.C. players
Polokwane City F.C. players
Moroka Swallows F.C. players
Sportspeople from Mpumalanga